Kevin John Innes (born 24 September 1975) is a former English cricketer. He was a right-handed batsman and a right-arm medium-fast bowler who used to play for Northamptonshire and Sussex. He retired in 2005.

Career
Innes started his career at Northamptonshire in 1994 as a teenager. In that season he played for England U19's and played 10 Test and ODI matches. After 7 years but only 21 first-class games at the County Ground, Kevin moved to Sussex in search of regular first team action. While at Sussex, he became the first and only 12th man to score a century as James Kirtley was to return from England duty and take his place half way through the match. After 24 first-class games in just two years, Innes retired due to injury but a year later turned out for Bedfordshire and other local league clubs. Innes returned to Northamptonshire as the Performance Coach/Fielding coach in 2008.

References

External links
 

1975 births
Living people
English cricketers
Northamptonshire cricketers
Sussex cricketers
Bedfordshire cricketers
People from Wellingborough